Jashipur is a Vidhan Sabha constituency of Mayurbhanj district, Odisha.

Area of this constituency includes Jashipur block, Raruan block, Sukruli block and 9 GPs (Badhatnabeda, Chuapani, Dhangdimuta, Hatbadra, Jarada, Jhipabandh, Talapati, Tolakpokhari and Uparbeda) of Kusumi block. Many villages consisting of small clusters of houses are located near Jashipur like Kanjipia, Keunjhar etc.

In 2009 election Biju Janata Dal candidate Kamala Kanta Nayak, defeated Independent candidate Sambhunath Naik by a margin of 13,190 votes.

Elected Members

13 elections held during 1957 to 2009. List of members elected from Jashipur Vidhan Sabha constituency are:

2009: (26): Kamala Nayak (BJD)
2004: (2): Sambhunath Naik (SUCI(C))
2000: (2): Bhanucharan Nayak (BJP)
1995: (2): Sambhunath Naik (SUCI(C))
1990: (2): Mangal Singh Madhi (Janata Dal) 
1985: (2): Sambhunath Nayak (Independent)
1980: (2): Sundar Mohan Majhi (Congress-I) 
1977: (2): Kahnuram Hembram (Janata Party) 
1974: (2): Ghanashyam Hembram (Independent)
1971: (2): Lal Mohan Nayak (Congress)
1967: (2): Durga Charan Nayak (Swatantra) 
1961: (135): Mochiram Tiriya (Congress) 
1957: (97): Mochiram Tiriya (Ganatantra Parishad)

2019 Election Result

2014 Election Result

Summary of results of the 2009 Election

Notes

References

Politics of Mayurbhanj district
Assembly constituencies of Odisha